Abel John Evans (December 20, 1852 – December 8, 1939) was an American politician and lawyer. Evans was born in Lehi, Utah County, Utah to Abel Evans and Mary Jones. Abel served as a member of the Utah Constitutional Convention in 1895 and as a Utah State Senator during the 1st through 3rd Utah State Legislatures (1896–1901).

When Evans was about 12 his father died.  Evans' father was serving as a missionary in Great Britain at the time of his death.

Abel Evans married Louisa E. Zimmerman, the daughter of John Zimmerman and Harriet Lamb, on January 26, 1874.  They were the parents of eleven children.

In 1889 Evans served a short term mission for the LDS Church in England.

From 1880 to 1888 Evans was a member of the Lehi city council.  In 1891 he was elected mayor of Utah as a Democrat.  He was a delegate to the Utah State Constitutional Convention which wrote the state constitution that was implemented when Utah became a state in 1896.

Evans was served as a counselor to Stephen L. Chipman in the Alpine Stake Presidency beginning in 1901.  This stake included most of Utah County north of Provo.

Sources 
 Andrew Jenson. LDS Biographical Encyclopedia. Vol. 3, p. 626

1852 births
1939 deaths
19th-century Mormon missionaries
American Mormon missionaries in England
Mayors of places in Utah
People from Lehi, Utah
Democratic Party Utah state senators
People of Utah Territory
Latter Day Saints from Utah